Fulica may refer to

Fulica (genus), waterbirds commonly known as coots
Fulica chloropus and Fulica fusca, related waterbirds commonly known as common moorhens
Heliornis fulica, an unrelated species commonly known as the sungrebe